A national library is established by the government of a nation to serve as the pre-eminent repository of information for that country. Unlike public libraries, they rarely allow citizens to borrow books. Often, they include numerous rare, valuable, or significant works; such as the Gutenberg Bible. National libraries are usually notable for their size, compared to that of other libraries in the same country. Some national libraries may be thematic or specialized in some specific domains, beside or in replacement of the 'main' national library.

Some national entities which are not independent but who wish to preserve their particular culture, have established a national library with all the attributes of such institutions, such as legal deposit.

Many national libraries cooperate within the National Libraries Section of the International Federation of Library Associations and Institutions (IFLA) to discuss their common tasks, define and promote common standards and carry out projects helping them to fulfil their duties. National libraries of Europe participate in The European Library. This is a service of The Conference of European National Librarians (CENL).

The list below is organized alphabetically by country, according to the list of sovereign states, including, at its end an 'other states' section for non-sovereign states. A "♦" indicates a national library of a province or state, or constituent country or dependent state . It is listed under the sovereign state which governs that entity. Sovereign states are listed even when they have no national library or when the existence and name of a national library could not yet be ascertained. Other states, constituent countries and dependent states are listed only if they have a national library.

National libraries

A

B

C

D

E

F

G

H

I

J

K

L

M

N

O

P

Q

R

S

T

U

V

W

Y

Z

Other States

State libraries
A state library is established by a state to serve as the preeminent repository of information for that region.

Australia

 ACT Heritage Library
 Library & Archives NT
 State Library of New South Wales
 State Library of Queensland
 State Library of South Australia
 State Library of Tasmania
 State Library Victoria
 State Library of Western Australia

Germany

 Bavarian State Library, Munich
 Berlin Central and Regional Library
 Göttingen State and University Library
 Hessian State Library, Wiesbaden
 Saxon State and University Library Dresden
 Württembergische Landesbibliothek, Stuttgart

India

 Goa State Central Library
 Harekrushna Mahtab State Library
 Nagaland State Library
 North Bengal State Library
 State Central Library, Hyderabad
 State Central Library, Kerala

Spain

Autonomous communities libraries
 Andalusia Library
 Aragon Library
 Asturias Library
 Central Library of Cantabria
 Castile and Leon Library
 Castile-La Mancha Library
 Library of Catalonia
 Extremadura Library
 Library of Galicia
 La Rioja Library
 Madrid Regional Library
 Murcia Regional Library
 Navarre Library
 Valencian Library

Switzerland
The member states of the Swiss Confederation are the 26 cantons of Switzerland. The  (German Kantonsbibliothek, French Bibliothèque cantonale, Italian Biblioteca cantonale, Romansh Biblioteca chantunala) are:
 Aargau: Aargauer Kantonsbibliothek
 Appenzell Ausserrhoden: Kantonsbibliothek Appenzell Ausserrhoden
 Appenzell Innerrhoden: Innerrhodische Kantonsbibliothek
 Basel-Landschaft: Kantonsbibliothek Baselland
 Basel-Stadt: Basel University Library (university and cantonal library)
 Bern: Bibliothek Münstergasse (formerly Zentralbibliothek Bern, Stadt- und Universitätsbibliothek Bern)
 Fribourg: Bibliothèque cantonale et universitaire de Fribourg
 Geneva: Bibliothèque de Genève
 Glarus: Glarner Landesbibliothek
 Grisons: Kantonsbibliothek Graubünden / Biblioteca chantunala dal Grischun / Biblioteca cantonale dei Grigioni 
 Jura: Bibliothèque cantonale jurassienne
 Luzern: Zentral- und Hochschulbibliothek Luzern (university and cantonal library)
 Neuchâtel: Bibliothèque publique et universitaire de Neuchâtel
 Nidwalden: Kantonsbibliothek Nidwalden
 Obwalden: Kantonsbibliothek Obwalden
 Schaffhausen: Stadtbibliothek Schaffhausen (city and cantonal library)
 Schwyz: Kantonsbibliothek Schwyz
 Solothurn: Zentralbibliothek Solothurn (city and cantonal library)
 St. Gallen: Kantonsbibliothek St. Gallen
 Ticino: four libraries, Biblioteca cantonale di Bellinzona, Biblioteca cantonale di Locarno, Biblioteca cantonale di Lugano, Biblioteca cantonale e del Liceo di Mendrisio
 Thurgau: Kantonsbibliothek Thurgau
 Uri: Kantonsbibliothek Uri
 Valais: Médiathèque Valais / Mediathek Wallis
 Vaud: Cantonal and University Library of Lausanne
 Zug: Bibliothek Zug
 Zürich: Zentralbibliothek Zürich (city, cantonal, and university library)

United States

See also
 European Library
 List of libraries
 List of libraries by country
 List of national archives
 List of U.S. state library associations
 Staatsbibliothek

Notes

References

External links
 
 
  Note: the IFLA now links to the Wikipedia list above (partly edited by IFLA members) instead of maintaining its own list, see also the Annual Report 2009 of the National Libraries Section.
 

Libraries
National and state libraries